Gracia Baptista (fl. 1557?) was a Spanish Roman Catholic nun and composer who lived in Ávila. Her setting of Conditor alme, published in 1557 in the Libro de cifra nueva para tecla, Arpa y Vihuela of Luis Venegas de Henestrosa, is the earliest keyboard work by an Iberian woman composer, the first published composition by a woman composer, and possibly the only surviving published keyboard work by an Iberian woman dating to before the eighteenth century. The piece is scored for voice and either organ or harpsichord. It has been recorded.

References

 
Spanish classical composers
Spanish Roman Catholic hymnwriters
Spanish women classical composers
16th-century Spanish nuns
16th-century classical composers
People from Ávila, Spain
16th-century women composers